The Asian Race Walking Championships is an annual race walking competition for athletes representing countries from Asia, organized by the Asian Athletics Association (AAA).  It was established in 2006 and has featured races for senior men (20 km and 50 km) and women (20 km).  After the inaugural event 2006 in Wajima, Japan, the competition was split into two events: the 20 km (both men and women) were incorporated into the All-Japan Race Walking competitions held in mid March in Nomi, Japan.  The 50 km event was held about a month later in mid April in Wajima, Japan.  This is established until the year 2008.  There are still annual national 50 km championships held in Wajima, but the further fate of the 50 km event within the Asian Race Walking Championships remains unknown.

Editions

Results 
Results were compiled from the Athletics Weekly, the Asian Athletics Association, the IAAF, the Fédération Suisse de Marche
 and the Tilastopaja webpages.

Men's results

20 kilometres

50 kilometres

Women's results

20 kilometres

All time medal table

See also
IAAF World Race Walking Cup
European Race Walking Cup
Pan American Race Walking Cup
South American Race Walking Championships
Oceania Race Walking Championships
Central American Race Walking Championships

References 

Race Walking Championships
Racewalking competitions
Recurring sporting events established in 2006
Continental athletics championships
2006 establishments in Japan
Sport in Ishikawa Prefecture
Nomi, Ishikawa
Wajima, Ishikawa